Illintsi is a town in Vinnytsia Oblast, Ukraine. It served as the administrative center of Illintsi Raion, until 2020 one of the raions (districts) of the oblast. Population: 

Not far from the town the Ilyinets crater is located.

History

In 1757, Ilińce was granted Magdeburg rights by King Augustus III of Poland. It was a private town of the Crown of the Kingdom of Poland, located in the Bracław Voivodeship and owned by the Sanguszko family.

Before World War II, the majority of the population was Jewish. Germans entered the town in July 1941 and kept the Jews as prisoners in a ghetto soon after. In November 1941, 43 Jews are murdered by hilfspolizei. On April 24, 1942, around 1,000 Jews from the town and nearby villages are assassinated in a mass execution. 700 others were murdered at the end of May 1942. At the end of 1942, remaining Jews were deported in a labor camp and the ghetto destroyed in December 1942.

Twin towns
Illintsi is twinned with:

  Włoszczowa, Poland, since August 23, 2005
  Edineț, Moldova, since September 13, 2013
  Pakruojis, Lithuania, since November 21, 2016
  Smižany, Slovakia, since May 5, 2017.

References

External links 
 
 

Cities in Vinnytsia Oblast
Kiev Governorate
Shtetls
Cities of district significance in Ukraine
Jewish Ukrainian history
Holocaust locations in Ukraine